Capital punishment is a legal punishment in American Samoa, an unincorporated territory of the United States. The only crime punishable by death is first degree murder. American Samoa last executed a prisoner on 24 November 1939, with hanging used as the method of execution, making capital punishment de facto abolished.

Territorial statutes require the jury to be unanimous to impose a death sentence. The court cannot impose sentence of death if the jury fails to agree on the punishment. The only other sentence allowed for first-degree murder is life without parole for 40 years. Statutes also do not provide for a method of execution.

Legal process
When the prosecution seeks the death penalty, upon conviction a sentence of death is decided by the jury. Such decision must be unanimous. 

In the event of a hung jury during the penalty phase of the trial, no death sentence can be issued, even if a single juror opposed death. There is no retrial.

Capital crimes
First-degree murder is punishable by death if it involves one or more of the following aggravating factors:

"the defendant previously has been convicted of first or second degree murder;
"at the time of the murder, the defendant committed another murder;
"the defendant created a grave risk of death to many persons;
"the murder was especially heinous, atrocious, or cruel, involving torture or other depravity; or
"the murder was purposely committed for pecuniary gain for the defendant or another person."

See also 
 Capital punishment in the United States

References

External links 
 American Samoa asked to scrap death penalty

S
Death in American Samoa
American Samoa law